Margaret Lindsay (born Margaret Kies; September 19, 1910 – May 9, 1981) was an American film actress. Her time as a Warner Bros. contract player during the 1930s was particularly productive. She was noted for her supporting work in successful films of the 1930s and 1940s such as Baby Face, Jezebel (1938) and Scarlet Street (1945) and her leading roles in lower-budgeted B movie films such as the Ellery Queen series at Columbia in the early 1940s. Critics regard her portrayal of Nathaniel Hawthorne's Hepzibah Pyncheon in the 1940 film The House of the Seven Gables as Lindsay's standout career role.

Early life
Lindsay was born in Dubuque, Iowa, the eldest of six children of a pharmacist father who died in 1930. According to Tom Longden of the Des Moines Register, "Peg" was "a tomboy who liked to climb pear trees" and was a "roller-skating fiend". She graduated in 1930 from Visitation Academy in Dubuque.

Career

1930s
After attending National Park Seminary in Washington, D.C., Lindsay convinced her parents to enroll her at the American Academy of Dramatic Arts in New York. She went abroad to England to make her stage debut. She appeared in plays such as Escape, Death Takes a Holiday, and The Romantic Age.
She was often mistaken as being British due to her convincing English accent. Her fellow dramatic-school student Robert Cummings was then posing as the Englishman "Blade Stanhope Conway" and convinced Margaret Kies to follow his example and adopt a new British identity - Margaret Lindsay.

She impressed Universal Studios enough to sign her for their 1932 version of The Old Dark House. As James Robert Parish and William T. Leonard wrote in Hollywood Players: The Thirties (Arlington House, 1976), Lindsay returned to America and arrived in Hollywood, only to discover that Gloria Stuart had been cast in her role in the film. After some minor roles in Pre-Code films such as Christopher Strong and the groundbreaking Baby Face, which starred Barbara Stanwyck, Lindsay was cast in the Fox Film Corporation's award-winning Cavalcade. Lindsay was selected for a small but memorable role as Edith Harris, a doomed English bride whose honeymoon voyage takes place on the Titanic.

She won the role by backing up her British accent with an elaborate "biography" that claimed she was born in a London suburb, the daughter of a London broker who sent her to a London convent for her education. "Although I looked and talked English... to tell them I was actually from Iowa would have lost the assignment for me," she later explained. 

Her work in Cavalcade earned her a contract at Warner Bros. where she became a reliable supporting player, working with Paul Muni, Errol Flynn, Henry Fonda, Warren William, Leslie Howard, George Arliss, Humphrey Bogart, Boris Karloff, and Douglas Fairbanks, Jr. Lindsay was cast four times as the love interest of James Cagney in Warner films from 1933 to 1935: Frisco Kid, Devil Dogs of the Air, G Men, and Lady Killer.

 
Lindsay co-starred with Bette Davis in four Warners films: as Davis's sister in Fog Over Frisco (1934); in Dangerous (1935), for which Davis won her first Best Actress Academy Award; in Bordertown with Paul Muni, and, lastly, as Davis's rival for Henry Fonda's affections in Jezebel (1938), which earned Davis her second Best Actress Academy Award.

 
 
An example of her work in a leading role in lower budget films while at Warner Bros. was The Law in Her Hands (1936), a comedy in which she played a mob lawyer. As film historian John McCarty wrote, it was "that rarity among gangster films to offer a female in the male-dominated mouthpiece role." Author Roger Dooley identified the movie as "being the only film of the 1930s to concern itself with a pair of female legal partners". Made after the Motion Picture Production Code came into effect, however, The Law in Her Hands was forced into adopting "a reactionary stance towards the gender switch", and concluded with a plot twist that was the complete opposite of the Pre-Code period (1929–1934), when "female characters on the screen could say, do, and be whatever they wanted."

1940s
Lindsay appeared in The House of the Seven Gables in 1940, with George Sanders and Vincent Price. Directed by Joe May from a screenplay by Lester Cole, the film's musical score by Frank Skinner was nominated for an Academy Award. Price recalled that "Margaret Lindsay was a delight to work with and a very good actress." 

Michael Brunas, John Brunas, and Tom Weaver wrote in Universal Horrors: The Studio's Classic Films, 1931–46 that Lindsay "...one of the loveliest and most talented of '30s leading ladies, contributes a fine, mature performance that's probably the best, certainly the most striking, in the picture... [h]ad a Bette Davis played Hepzibah, this same performance would be hailed as a classic..."

In a 2004 Classic Images article about actor Jon Hall, film historian Colin Briggs wrote that a letter he had received from Lindsay indicated that her part in The House of the Seven Gables was her "favorite role." Lindsay's letter to Briggs also stated that the film she had the most fun with was The Vigilantes Return (1947), in which she co-starred with Jon Hall. "... [That] role was a complete departure from my usual parts and I grabbed it... I even warbled a Mae West type ditty. As a man-chasing saloon singer after Jon Hall it was for me a totally extroverted style and I relished the opportunity... I have a framed still from that film on a wall in my home."

Her 1940s film series work in Hollywood included Columbia's first entry in its Crime Doctor series, as well as her continuing role as Nikki Porter in Columbia's Ellery Queen series (1940–1942). Author Jon Tuska's affection for the Ellery Queen series mystified its star Ralph Bellamy. During an interview by Tuska for his 1978 book, The Detective in Hollywood, he remarked, "I'm one of the few who does [like the series]." "I don't know how ... They were such quickie pictures", Bellamy replied.

Jon Tuska cited Ellery Queen, Master Detective (1940) and Ellery Queen's Penthouse Mystery (1941) as the best of the Bellamy-Lindsay pairings. "The influence of The Thin Man series was apparent in reverse," Tuska noted about Ellery Queen's Penthouse Mystery. "Ellery and Nikki are unmarried but obviously in love with each other. Probably the biggest mystery ... is how Ellery ever gets a book written. Not only is Nikki attractive and perfectly willing to show off her figure ... but she also likes to write her own stories on Queen's time, and gets carried away doing her own investigations", Tuska opined.

Lindsay appeared in a supporting role in the 1942 film The Spoilers, starring Marlene Dietrich and John Wayne, and in Fritz Lang's Scarlet Street (1945) with Edward G. Robinson and Joan Bennett. While her work in the late 1940s would occasionally involve a supporting role in MGM films like Cass Timberlane (1948) with Spencer Tracy and Lana Turner, her film career went into decline, with roles in films at Poverty Row studios like Monogram Pictures and PRC. She returned to the stage and co-starred with Franchot Tone in The Second Man.

1950s and 1960s
She made her television debut in 1950 in The Importance of Being Earnest, which allowed her to once again display her finely-honed British accent. More television work followed. Lindsay appeared in only four films during the 1950s and two in the 1960s. Her final feature film was Tammy and the Doctor (1963).

Personal life 
Early in her career, Lindsay lived with her sister Helen in Hollywood. Later in life, she lived with her youngest sister, Mickie. She never married. According to biographer and historian William J. Mann, Lindsay was the life partner of musical theatre, film, and television actress Mary McCarty.

Death
Lindsay died at the age of 70 of emphysema in 1981 at the Good Samaritan Hospital in Los Angeles. She was buried at Holy Cross Cemetery, Culver City, California.

Family
Lindsay's sister, Jane Kies, was also an actress under the stage name Jane Gilbert.

Complete filmography

Okay, America! (1932) as Ruth Drake
The Fourth Horseman (1932) as Molly O'Rourke
The All American (1932) as Miss Bowen
Once in a Lifetime (1932) as Dr. Lewis' Secretary
Cavalcade (1933) as Edith Harris
West of Singapore (1933) as Shelby Worrell
Christopher Strong (1933) as Autograph Seeker at Party (uncredited)
Private Detective 62 (1933) as Janet
Baby Face (1933) as Ann Carter
Voltaire (1933) as Nanette
Captured! (1933) as Monica A. Allison
Paddy the Next Best Thing (1933) as Eileen Adair
From Headquarters (1933) as Lou Winton
The World Changes (1933) as Jennifer Clinton Nordholm
The House on 56th Street (1933) as Eleanor Van Tyle Burgess
Lady Killer (1933) as Lois Underwood
Merry Wives of Reno (1934) as Madge
Fog Over Frisco (1934) as Valkyr Bradford
The Dragon Murder Case (1934) as Bernice
Gentlemen Are Born (1934) as Joan Harper
Bordertown (1935) as Dale Elwell
Devil Dogs of the Air (1935) as Betty Roberts
The Florentine Dagger (1935) as Florence
The Case of the Curious Bride (1935) as Rhoda Montaine
G Men (1935) as Kay McCord
Personal Maid's Secret (1935) as Joan
Frisco Kid (1935) as Jean Barrat
Dangerous (1935) as Gail Armitage
The Lady Consents (1936) as Gerry Mannerly
The Law in Her Hands (1936) as Mary Wentworth
Public Enemy's Wife (1936) as Judith Roberts Maroc
Isle of Fury (1936) as Lucille Gordon
Sinner Take All (1936) as Lorraine
Green Light (1937) as Frances Ogilvie
Song of the City (1937) as Angelina Romandi
Slim (1937) as Cally
Back in Circulation (1937) as Arline Wade
Breakdowns of 1938 (1938, Short) (uncredited)
Gold is Where You Find It (1938) as Rosanne
Jezebel (1938) as Amy Bradford Dillard
When Were You Born (1938) as Doris Kane (Leo)
Garden of the Moon (1938) as Toni Blake
Broadway Musketeers (1938) as Isabel 'Isabelle' Dowling Peyton
There's That Woman Again (1938) as Mrs. Nacelle
On Trial (1939) as Mae Strickland
Hell's Kitchen (1939) as Beth
The Under-Pup (1939) as Mrs. Cooper
20,000 Men a Year (1939) as Ann Rogers
British Intelligence (1940) as Helene von Lorbeer
Honeymoon Deferred (1940) as Janet Payne Farradene
The House of the Seven Gables (1940) as Hepzibah Pyncheon
Double Alibi (1940) as Sue Casey
Meet the Wildcat (1940) as Ann Larkin
Ellery Queen, Master Detective (1940) as Nikki Porter
Ellery Queen's Penthouse Mystery (1941) as Nikki Porter
The Hard-Boiled Canary (1941) as Sylvia Worth
Ellery Queen and the Perfect Crime (1941) as Nikki Porter
Ellery Queen and the Murder Ring (1941) as Nikki Porter
A Close Call for Ellery Queen (1942) as Nikki Porter
A Tragedy at Midnight (1942) as Beth Sherman
A Desperate Chance for Ellery Queen (1942) as Nikki Porter
The Spoilers (1942) as Helen Chester
Enemy Agents Meet Ellery Queen (1942) as Nikki Porter
No Place for a Lady (1943) as June Terry
Let's Have Fun (1943) as Florence Blake
Crime Doctor (1943) as Grace Fielding
Alaska (1944) as Roxie Reagan
Adventures of Rusty (1945) as Ann Mitchell
Club Havana (1945) as Rosalind
Scarlet Street (1945) as Millie Ray
Her Sister's Secret (1946) as Renee DuBois Gordon
The Vigilantes Return (1947) as Kitty
Seven Keys to Baldpate (1947) as Connie Lane
Louisiana (1947) as Alvern Adams
Cass Timberlane (1947) as Chris Grau
B.F.'s Daughter (1948) as 'Apples' Sandler
The Bottom of the Bottle (1956) as Hannah Cady
Emergency Hospital (1956) as Dr. Janet Carey
The Restless Years (1958) as Dorothy Henderson
Jet Over the Atlantic (1959) as Mrs. Lanyard
Please Don't Eat the Daisies (1960) as Mona James
Tammy and the Doctor (1963) as Rachel Colman, Head Nurse
The Chadwick Family (1974, TV movie) as Elly (final film role)

References

Further reading

 Bellamy, Ralph.  (1979).  When the Smoke Hits the Fan.  Garden City, NY:  Doubleday .
 Bookbinder, Robert.  (1985).  Classics of the Gangster Film.  Secaucus, NJ:  Citadel Press.  .
 Briggs, Colin.  (2004).  Jon Hall:  The King of Technicolor in Classic Images, January, 2004 issue. Muscatine, Iowa:  Classic Images.
 Brunas, Michael, Brunas, John and Weaver, Tom. (1990). Universal Horrors:  The Studio's Classic Films, 1931 - 1946.  Jefferson, North Carolina:  McFarland.  .
 Dickens, Homer. (1989). The Complete Films of James Cagney.  Secaucus, NJ:  Citadel Press.  .
 Dooley, Roger. (1984). From Scarface to Scarlett:  American Films in the 1930s.  New York: Harcourt.  
 Hardy, Phil (editor).  (2000).  The Overlook Film Encyclopedia: The Gangster Film.  Woodstock, New York:  The Overlook Press.  .
 Katz, Ephraim. (2001). The Film Encyclopedia, Fourth Edition.  Revised by Klein, Fred and Nolen, Ronald Dean.  New York, New York: HarperCollins Publishers.  .
 
 Maltin, Leonard. (1994). Leonard Maltin's Movie Encyclopedia.  New York, New York:  Dutton/Penguin.  .
 Mann, William J. (2001) Behind the Screen: How Gays and Lesbians Shaped Hollywood, 1910-1969. New York: Viking. .
 McCarty, Clifford. (1990). The Complete Films of Humphrey Bogart.  Secaucus, NJ:  Citadel Press. .
 McCarty, John.  (2004).  Bullets Over Hollywood:  The American Gangster Film from the Silents to The Sopranos.  Cambridge, MA:  Da Capo Press.  .
 Parish, James Robert, editor. (1971).  The Great Movie Series.  South Brunswick and New York:  A. S. Barnes.  .
 Parish, James Robert and Leonard, William T. (1976). Hollywood Players:  The Thirties.  New Rochelle, New York:  Arlington House Publishers.  .
 Ringgold, Gene. (1990).  The Complete Films of Bette Davis.  Secaucus, NJ:  Citadel Press.  
 Sennett, Ted. (1971). Warner Brothers Presents. New Rochelle, New York:  Arlington House Publishers.  .
 Svehla, Gary J. and Susan, editors. (1998).  Vincent Price [Midnight Marquee Actors Series].  Baltimore, MD:  Midnight Marquee Press.  .
 Thomas, Tony. (1990).  The Complete Films of Errol Flynn.  Secaucus, NJ:  Citadel Press.  .
 Tuska, Jon (1978).  The Detective in Hollywood. Garden City, New York:  Doubleday & Company.  .
 Variety Obituaries, Volume 9:  1980 - 1983.  New York and London:  Garland Publishing.  ,
 Williams, Lucy Chase.  (1998).  The Complete Films of Vincent Price.  Secaucus, NJ:  Citadel Press .

External links

Margaret Lindsay bio at Ellery Queen fansite

1910 births
1981 deaths
Actresses from Iowa
American film actresses
Burials at Holy Cross Cemetery, Culver City
Deaths from emphysema
People from Dubuque, Iowa
Warner Bros. contract players
20th-century American actresses
LGBT people from Iowa
American lesbian actresses
National Park Seminary alumni
20th-century American LGBT people